is a concrete gravity dam on the Ōtakine River, a branch of the Abukuma River in the town of Miharu, Fukushima in the Tōhoku region of Japan. The dam was completed in 1997.

Geography 
The Miharu Dam is a multipurpose dam directly controlled by the Japanese Ministry of Land, Infrastructure, Transport and Tourism. It is aimed at flood control on the middle reaches of the Abukuma River and to provide a content source of water for central Fukushima Prefecture, including the city of Koriyama. It was initially called Ōtakine Dam, but was renamed Miharu Dam at the request of the local inhabitants. Also, in consideration of the landscape, the dam body was decorated like a stone wall, reflecting Miharu's status as a castle town. The reservoir created by the dam is called Lake Sakura, and has become a local tourist destination. There is a museum (Miharu Dam Museum} located next to the dam.

See also 
Miharu,Fukushima
Miharu Takizakura

References 

Dams in Fukushima Prefecture
Dams completed in 1997
Gravity dams
Miharu, Fukushima